General elections were held in Barbados on 2 September 1976. The result was a victory for the Barbados Labour Party, which won 17 of the 24 seats, defeating the ruling Democratic Labour Party and returning to power for the first time since 1961. This was the first and only election contested by the newly formed People's Political Alliance, whose eight candidates won only 572 votes. Voter turnout was 74.1%.

Results

References

Barbados
1976 in Barbados
Elections in Barbados
September 1976 events in North America